Diamante Azzura Bovelli (born September 7, 1996), known mononymously as DIAMANTE, is an American singer and songwriter.

Career 

Diamante's first widely released work was the 2017 single "Haunted". Her album Coming in Hot was released under Better Noise Records on June 15, 2018.

In 2018, she provided guest vocals on the Bad Wolves song "Hear Me Now", from the band's debut album Disobey, which reached number one on active rock radio. In early to mid-2019, she toured in support of Breaking Benjamin to further promote her album.

On January 17, 2020, she announced her departure from Better Noise Music and released the single "Obvious" through her own label, Anti-Heroine. An acoustic version of the song was released on February 14, 2020. On April 17, 2020, Diamante released the third single "Serves You Right". On May 29, 2020, she released the fourth single "Ghost Myself". Her cover of the Goo Goo Dolls' "Iris" was released on July 10, 2020, and features Breaking Benjamin frontman Benjamin Burnley.

In April 2021, Diamante announced that her second studio album, American Dream, would be released independently on May 7. In 2021 and 2022, Diamante made several festival appearances and toured in support of Shinedown and The Pretty Reckless to promote the album. 

On October 28, 2022, Diamante released a cover EP titled The Diamond Covers.

Discography

Studio albums

Extended plays

Singles

As lead artist

As featured artist

Music videos

References 

Living people
1996 births
American women singer-songwriters
American people of Italian descent
Musicians from Boston
American alternative rock musicians
American hard rock musicians
American women heavy metal singers
American women rock singers
Alternative rock singers
Singer-songwriters from Massachusetts
21st-century American women singers
21st-century American singers